Justice Neil may refer to:

A. B. Neil, associate justice of the Tennessee Supreme Court
Matthew M. Neil, associate justice of the Tennessee Supreme Court

See also
Tom W. Neal, associate justice of the New Mexico Supreme Court
Marshall Allen Neill, associate justice of the Washington Supreme Court